There are a number of distinguished citizens of Ahmedabad who have been awarded with the highest civilian awards of the country.

Bharat Ratna
 Sardar Vallabhbhai Patel - awarded posthumously in 1991
 Gulzarilal Nanda - awarded posthumously in 1997

Padma Vibhushan
 Dr. Vikram Sarabhai - Padma Bhushan in 1966, Padma Vibhushan awarded posthumously in 1972

Padma Bhushan
 Mrinalini Sarabhai - Padma Shri in 1965, Padma Bhushan 1992
 Ela Bhatt - Padma Shri in 1985, Padma Bhushan in 1986
 George Joseph - awarded in 1999
 Mallika Sarabhai - awarded in 2010

Padma Shri
 Balkrishna Doshi - awarded in 1976
 Geet Sethi - awarded in 1986
 Haku Shah - awarded in 1989
 Jasu Patel - awarded in 1960
 Keshavram Kashiram Shastri - awarded in 1976
 Kumudini Lakhia - awarded in 1987
 Pramod Kale - awarded in 1984
 P.R. Pisharoty - awarded in 1970
 Satya Prakash - awarded in 1982
 Kartikeya Sarabhai - awarded in 2012
 Taarak Mehta - awarded in 2015
 Tejas Patel - awarded twice 
 Anil K Gupta - awarded in 2004

Other 
 Alisha Chinai, an Indian pop singer known for her Indi-pop albums as well as playback singing in Hindi cinema.
 Sakharam Ganesh Pandit, an Indian-American lawyer and civil rights activist
 Darshan Raval, an Indian singer & composer.
 Disha Vakani, Actor and Worked in The Show Taarak Mehta Ka Ooltah Chashmah
 Dr. Vikran I. Shah, an Indian orthopedic surgeon, based in Ahmedabad. Shah established Shalby Hospitals in 1994.
 Ali Sher Bengali, 16th-century Sufi saint of the Shattari order

References

People from Ahmedabad
Ahmedabad
Ahmedabad